The 2000 Asian Junior Badminton Championships were held in Nishiyama Park Gymnasium, Kyoto, Japan from 21–27 July and organized by the Kyoto Badminton Association. 21 countries competed at this competition, and in the end of the tournament, China clinched all the titles.

Seeded
In the team event, Indonesia and China were the first seeded in the boys' and girls' team event. Shoji Sato was the first seeded in the boys' singles, and at the boys' doubles he also first seeded with Sho Sasaki. Wei Yan, Zhao Tingting/Li Yujia, and Sang Yang/Zhang Yawen from China were seeded first in the girls' singles, girls' doubles and mixed doubles respectively.

Boys' team
1. 
2. 
3. 
3. 

Girls' team
1. 
2.

Boys' singles

1.  Shoji Sato
2.  Zhu Weilun
3.  Lin Dan
3.  Sony Dwi Kuncoro
5.  Lee Chong Wei
5.  Liao Sheng-shiun
5.  Jang Young-soo
5.  Jackaphan Thanat

9.  Qiu Bohui
9.  Chan Yan Kit
9.  Anup Shridhar
9.  Anggun Nugroho
9.  Sho Sasaki
9.  Jung Jin-chul
9.  Hendra Wijaya
9.  Chin Sheng-ming

Girls' singles

1.  Wei Yan
2.  Ng Mee Fen
3.  Xiao Luxi
3.  Chien Yu-chin

5.  Jun Jae-youn
5.  Park Hyo-sun
5.  Si Jin-sun
5.  Liu Fan

Boys' doubles

1.  Shoji Sato/ Sho Sasaki
2.  Xie Zhongbo/ Cao Chen
3.  Sang Yang/ Zheng Bo
3.  Yan Peter/ Tri Heru Pamungkas

5.  Naoki Kawamae/ Yusuke Shinkai
5.  Lee Jae-jin/ Jung Jae-sung
5.  Liu Chi-cheng/ Hsu Wei-hung

Girls' doubles

1.  Zhao Tingting/ Li Yujia
2.  Zhang Yawen/ Wei Yili
3.  Kim So-yeon/ Jung Yeon-kyung

5.  Naoki Kawamae/ Yusuke Shinkai
5.  Chien Hsiu-lin/ Cheng Wen-hsing

Mixed doubles

1.  Sang Yang/ Zhang Yawen
2.  Zheng Bo/ Wei Yili
3.  Shoji Sato/ Tomomi Matsuda
3.  Lee Jae-jin/ Hwang Yu-mi

5.  Bambang Saifulloh/ Lina Marlina
5.  Kohei Hayasaka/ Aki Akao
5.  Jackaphan Thanat/ Salakjit Ponsana
5.  Tsai Chia-hsin/ Cheng Wen-hsing

Results

Semifinals

Finals

Medalists 
In the boys' singles final, Lin Dan beat the Indonesian player Sony Dwi Kuncoro with the score 15–12, 15–5. Sang Yang and Zheng Bo won the boys' doubles title after defeat the Korean pair Lee Jae-jin and Jung Jae-sung in the rubber game with the score 17–16, 11–15, 15–12. Zheng Bo also won the mixed doubles title with Wei Yili, after the first seeded retired in the final match. while Wei also won the girls' doubles title with Zhang Yawen beat their compatriot Zhao Tingting and Li Yujia, 15–12, 15–5. The girls' singles title goes to Yu Jin who beat the top seeded Wei Yan with the score 15–5 and 15–3. China also secures the boys' and girls' team event after beat the Indonesia men's team and South Korea women's team with the score 3–0 respectively.

Medal table

References

External links 
 Team results
 Results at ''archive.org

Badminton Asia Junior Championships
Asian Junior Badminton Championships
Asian Junior Badminton Championships
International sports competitions hosted by Japan
2000 in youth sport
Sports competitions in Kyoto